Indirect presidential elections were held in Turkey on November 1, 1957 immediately after the 1957 general elections on October 27. Members of the Grand National Assembly re-elected Celâl Bayar as president.

Results

References

Presidential elections in Turkey
Presidential
Single-candidate elections